"Alles neu" (German for "Everything New") is the debut single by German musician Peter Fox. Released on 15 August 2008, it appeared on his album Stadtaffe and reached number four in Germany.

Production
The song heavily samples the 4th movement of Dmitri Shostakovich's 7th Symphony, and was itself sampled by English rapper Plan B on his 2012 hit single "Ill Manors".

Music video
The song's music video features Fox performing the song accompanied by drummers in suits and monkey masks, dancing women dressed in dirndls, and other peculiar sights.

Charts

Weekly charts

Year-end charts

Certifications

References

2008 singles
2008 songs
Songs written by Peter Fox (musician)
Warner Records singles